The Alfa Romeo 690 engine is a custom-built, production-based, high-revving, prototype, four-stroke, 2.5-liter, naturally aspirated, V-6 racing engine, designed, developed and produced by Alfa Romeo, purpose-built for the 1996 ITC season. It was loosely based on the PRV engine, used in the Lancia Thema 6v.

Applications
Alfa Romeo 155 V6 TI

References

Alfa Romeo
V6 engines
Alfa Romeo engines
Gasoline engines by model
Engines by model
Piston engines
Internal combustion engine